Asif Ahmed may refer to:

 Asif Ahmed (cricketer, born 1992), Bangladeshi cricketer
 Asif Ahmed (cricketer, born 1942), Pakistani cricketer
 Asif Ahmed (academic), British vascular and obstetric scientist

See also
 Asif Ahmad (born 1956), British diplomat